José Botelho de Carvalho Araújo (18 May 1881 – 14 October 1918) was a Portuguese Navy officer and colonial administrator who died in action in World War I battling German U-boat SM U-139, commanded by submarine ace Lothar von Arnauld de la Perière.

Life

Son of José de Carvalho Araújo Júnior and Margarida Ferreira Botelho de Araújo, he was born in the northern city of Porto at the parish of São Nicolau, while his parents were visiting the city. Two months later, his parents returned to Vila Real in Trás os Montes where they lived.

After completing his studies at the Academia Politécnica do Porto, he enlisted in the Portuguese Navy in 1899.

He served on several ships: the frigate Dom Afonso, the corvette Duque da Terceira, the cruisers Vasco da Gama, Adamastor and São Rafael, the gunboats Zambeze, Liberal, Diu and Lúrio, the tugboat Bérrio and the transport ship Salvador Correia.

A strong supporter of the republican ideals, he was elected deputy after the proclamation of the Portuguese Republic and governor of the Inhambane district in the Portuguese colony of Mozambique.

He died on 14 October 1918, at the command of the Portuguese naval trawler NRP Augusto Castilho while successfully protecting the cargo ship São Miguel from the attack of the German U-boat SM U-139, commanded by submarine ace Lothar von Arnauld de la Perière. The German U-boat engaged the São Miguel on the surface with her 15 cm SK L/45 deck gun, but was immediately confronted by Augusto Castilho, which set a smoke screen to deceive the Germans. A two-hour fierce battle ensued, that ended with the sinking of the Portuguese trawler and the loss of four of the crew, among them First Lieutenant Carvalho Araújo. São Miguel managed to slip away, eventually reaching the port of Ponta Delgada in the Azores.

Navy career
1903 - Midshipman
1905 - Lieutenant
1915 - First Lieutenant
1918 - Captain-Lieutenant (posthumous rank)

Notes

References
Fernando Félix Lopes, Missões franciscanas em Moçambique, 1898-1970 (1972)

External links
(English) (Portuguese) University of Porto - Official website

1881 births
1918 deaths
University of Porto alumni
Portuguese military officers
Portuguese military personnel killed in World War I
Portuguese colonial governors and administrators
People from Porto
People from Vila Real, Portugal
Recipients of the Order of the Tower and Sword